KBPT-LP is a low power radio station in Bishop, California. It is owned by BIshop Paiute Tribe. The station is a member of the National Federation of Community Broadcasters.

History
KBPT-LP began broadcasting on May 29, 2015.

References

External links
 

2016 establishments in California
Bishop, California
BPT-LP
BPT-LP
Community radio stations in the United States
Radio stations established in 2016